The Women's 400m freestyle event at the 2010 South American Games was held on March 26, with the heats at 10:23 and the Final at 18:11.

Medalists

Records

Results

Heats

Final

References
Heats
Final

Freestyle 400m W